R. laeta may refer to:

 Rhabdomastix laeta, a crane fly
 Russula laeta, a brittle gill